Raymond Christopher White (born 29 January 1941) is a former South African cricketer. He played for Gloucestershire between 1962 and 1964 and for Transvaal from 1965–66 to 1972–73.

White was educated at Hilton College and the University of Cambridge, where he participated in the 1962 Varsity Match.

He was president of Cricket South Africa from 1998 to 2000.

References

External links

1941 births
Living people
South African cricketers
Gloucestershire cricketers
Cricketers from Johannesburg
Cambridge University cricketers
Free Foresters cricketers
Gentlemen cricketers
Gauteng cricketers
Alumni of Hilton College (South Africa)